"Livin' for the Weekend" is a song by American R&B vocal group The O'Jays, released as the second single from their 11th album, Family Reunion (1975). It spent two weeks at #1 on the R&B singles chart in the spring of '76. It was also successful on the pop charts, peaking at #20 on the Billboard Hot 100. The B-side of the single, "Stairway to Heaven," proved to be just as popular.

Chart positions

References

External links
[ Song Review] on the Allmusic website

1976 singles
The O'Jays songs
1975 songs
Philadelphia International Records singles
Songs written by Kenny Gamble
Songs written by Leon Huff
Songs with lyrics by Cary Gilbert